The Musée Picasso, formerly the Château Grimaldi at Antibes, is built upon the foundations of the ancient Greek town of Antipolis. Antibes is a resort town in the Alpes-Maritimes department in southeastern France, on the Mediterranean Sea. The castle is the subject of a classification as historical monuments since April 29, 1928.

History
The Château Grimaldi was originally built in the late fourteenth century as the residence of the town's feudal lords Marc and Luc Grimaldi, scions of the famous Grimaldi Dynasty, and has borne their name ever since. During the French Revolution it was seized by the revolutionary authorities, which set up the town hall there; after the Bourbon Restoration it was converted into a barracks.

From 1925, the chateau was known as the Grimaldi Museum, and for six months in 1946, it was the home of the famous artist Pablo Picasso. Today the museum is known as the Picasso Museum, and was indeed the first museum in the world to be dedicated to the artist.

Picasso himself donated works to the museum, altogether 23 paintings and 44 drawings, most notably his paintings La Chèvre (sculpture) and La Joie de vivre.  In 1990 Jacqueline Picasso bequeathed many works by Picasso to the museum. These included four paintings, ten drawings, two ceramics and six etchings. These are displayed at the Château in addition to the three works on paper, sixty etchings and six carpets by Pablo Picasso, which the museum collected between 1952 and 2001.  Today the collection totals 245 works by Picasso.

See also
 List of single-artist museums

References 

Picasso Museum retrieved 2 February 2007
 Antibes-Juan-les-Pins retrieved 2 February 2007
On Picasso’s Trail, From Antibes to Avignon
Picasso finds new lease of life in Antibes

External links
Image of Château Grimaldi retrieved 2 February 2007

Pablo Picasso
Art museums and galleries in France
Buildings and structures in Antibes
Châteaux in Alpes-Maritimes
Museums in Alpes-Maritimes
Biographical museums in France
Art museums established in 1925
Picasso